Anthony de Mello, also known as Tony de Mello (4 September 1931 – 2 June 1987), was an Indian Jesuit priest and psychotherapist. A spiritual teacher, writer, and public speaker, de Mello wrote several books on spirituality and hosted numerous spiritual retreats and conferences. He continues to be known for his storytelling which drew from the various mystical traditions of both East and West and for introducing many people in the West to mindfulness-based practices he sometimes called "awareness prayer".

Beginnings 
De Mello was the oldest of five children born to Frank and Louisa (née Castellino) de Mello. He was born in Bombay, British India, on 4 September 1931. He was raised in a Catholic family and dreamed of one day joining the Jesuit order.

At the age of 16, de Mello entered the Society of Jesus at the seminary of Vinalaya on the outskirts of Bombay. In 1952, he was sent to Spain to study philosophy in Barcelona before undertaking ministry. He then returned to India to study theology at De Nobili College in Pune and was ordained to the priesthood in March 1961. After his return to India, he spent several years working in seminaries, and in 1968 he was made rector of the seminary of Vinalaya.

De Mello was first attracted to the Jesuits for their strict discipline. Those who knew him during his earlier years in the order described him as somewhat conservative in his theology and reluctant to explore other religions. Some of his peers noted that his experience in Spain led him to broaden his perspective and to lose much of his rigidity.

Work 
In 1972, he founded the Institute of Pastoral Counselling, later renamed the Sadhana Institute of Pastoral Counselling, in Poona, India. De Mello's first published book, Sadhana – A Way to God, was released in 1978. It outlined a number of spiritual principles and "Christian exercises in Eastern form" inspired by the teachings of Saint Ignatius. It popularized the notion of "awareness prayer" in the United States for his readers and for those who attended his lectures.

Death 
De Mello died of a heart attack in 1987, aged 55, in New York City. Bill De Mello, a brother of Tony's, recounts in his book Anthony deMello: The Happy Wanderer that Tony's body was found by Fr. Frank Stroud, S.J. According to Fr. Stroud, de Mello's body was curled up in a fetal position. His official death certificate lists the immediate cause of his death as "Atherosclerotic coronary artery disease with recent thrombosis of left circumflex branch."

Posthumous controversy 

In 1998, 11 years after de Mello's death, the Congregation for the Doctrine of the Faith under the leadership of its Cardinal-Prefect, Joseph Ratzinger (who later became Pope Benedict XVI), conducted a review of de Mello's work and released a lengthy comment expressing theological concern that de Mello's books "are incompatible with the Catholic faith and can cause grave harm". The Indian magazine Outlook saw this as an attempt by Rome to undermine the clergy in Asia amid widening fissures between Rome and the Asian Church. De Mello's books are available in many Catholic bookshops in the West, but include the advisory that they were written in a multi-religious context and are not intended to be manuals on Christian doctrine.

Bibliography 
A number of de Mello's works were published posthumously as collections or based on notes or recordings of his conferences.

Sadhana: A Way to God, 1978. 
Wake Up! Spirituality for Today, 90 minutes of talks given before a live audience
The Song of the Bird, Image, 1982. 
Wellsprings, 1984. 
One Minute Wisdom, Image, 1985. 
The Heart of the Enlightened, Doubleday, 1987. 
Taking Flight, Image, 1988. 
Awareness, Image, 1990. 
Contact with God, Loyola Press, 1991. 
The Way to Love, 1992. 
One Minute Nonsense, Loyola University Press, 1992 
More One Minute Nonsense, Loyola University Press, 1993 
Call to Love, Gujarat Sahitya Prakash, 1996
Rooted in God, St Pauls, 1997
Awakening, Image, 2003. 
A Way to God for Today, RCL Benziger, 2007
Seek God Everywhere, Image, 2010 
The Prayer of the Frog Vol. 1 & Vol. 2. In the English printing, these are titled Taking Flight and The Heart of the Enlightened

References

Further reading

Biography
Tony de Mello, S.J.: A Short Biography, by Bill De Mello (brother)

Online resources
De Mello Spirituality Center website
"Notification Concerning the Writings of Fr. Anthony de Mello, SJ"
Spiritual Stories from Anthony de Mello
Quotes by de Mello

Multimedia
"Rediscovery of Life", a conference by de Mello in five parts
Online de Mello resource including videos and MP3s
"Remembering Anthony DeMello", Humankind Public Radio program recorded at a retreat held at Fordham University shortly before his death.

1931 births
1987 deaths
20th-century Christian mystics
Roman Catholic mystics
20th-century Indian Jesuits
Indian emigrants to the United States
Indian self-help writers
Indian spiritual writers
20th-century Indian Roman Catholic theologians
Jesuit theologians
Spiritual teachers
Psychotherapists
Dissident Roman Catholic theologians
American male writers of Indian descent
20th-century American male writers